The ČSD class E 422.0 (Class 100 since 1987) is a Czech electric locomotive, intended for secondary lines electrified at 1.5kV DC. The locomotives were produced by Škoda Works in 1956 and 1957 under the designation Škoda 15E.

History
The locomotives were built for the Tábor–Bechyně and Rybník–Lipno nad Vltavou railways, both of which were electrified with non standard 1.5kV DC electrification. The locomotives were delivered to ČSD during early 1957. After approval testing had been carried out, and modifications made, the locomotives entered service in July 1957. They were then used mostly on freight services until 1973, when the new ČSD E 426.0 class locomotives were delivered, cascading the locomotives onto passenger work.

The locomotives started to be withdrawn in 1997, with locomotive 4 being scrapped in 1998, and locomotive 2 being used as a source of spare parts. The last 100 in regular service was locomotive 3, withdrawn in 2002.

Preservation
Since withdrawal, locomotive 1 and 3 have been kept operational by ČD, and are used occasionally on special journeys, based at Tábor. Locomotive 2 is currently owned by the National Technical Museum, and stored at Chomutov.

See also

List of České dráhy locomotive classes

References 

Standard gauge locomotives of Czechoslovakia
Standard gauge locomotives of the Czech Republic
Electric locomotives of the Czech Republic
Electric locomotives of Czechoslovakia
Railway locomotives introduced in 1956
Bo′Bo′ locomotives
Škoda locomotives

Bo′Bo′ electric locomotives of Europe